Once Upon a Song, is a 2015 musical drama television series produced by Hong Kong Television Network. The first episode premiered on January 16, 2015.

Cast
 Evelyn Choi as Yan Chi-ching
 Kelvin Kwan as Keith
 Kate Yeung as Jade
 Jason Chan as Handsome
 William So as Simon
 Bernice Liu as Agnes
 Zac Kao as Calvin
 Shek Sau as Jonathan
 Mimi Kung as Julie
 Rain Lau as Lee Mei-ha
 Lesley Chiang as Karlie
 Charles Ying as Sky
 Lisa Lui as Cheung Hiu-wan
 Savio Tsang as Yip Ming
 Benji Chiang as Alex
 Karen Lee as Heidi
 Leung Kin-ping as Wilson
 Wilson Tsui as Jade's biological father
 Yau Biu as Do
 Sin Ho-ying as Re
 Wong Man-piu as Mi
 Dexter Young as Dr. Charles Kwok, episode 6 and 9
 Mark Lui as mysterious traffic officer, episode 15 and 16

Song list
 "做場好戲" by William So, Charles Ying, Kate Yeung, Jason Chan, Lesley Chiang, Benji Chiang (Opening theme song)
 "隻字不提" by Kelvin Kwan (Ending theme song)
 "得天獨厚" by Jade (Kate Yeung) (Music video for Kate Yeung's character Jade on episode 1)
 "即使不再是朋友" by Simon (William So) (Music video for William So's character Simon on episode 3)
 "追蹤彩虹" by Evelyn Choi (Ending theme song on episode 3)
 "Forever" by Lesley Chiang (Karlie's audition on episode 4)
 "得而復失" by Evelyn Choi (Ending theme song on episode 6)
 "愛即是遊戲" by Charles Ying (Dance-off on episode 8)
 "一字一淚" by Jason Chan (Episode 11)
 "奇蹟" by Kate Yeung (Ending theme song on episode 11)

References

External links
 Official website

Hong Kong Television Network original programming
2015 Hong Kong television series debuts
2010s Hong Kong television series